Abdul Jalil Pradhan is a Jatiya Party (Ershad) politician and the former Member of Parliament of Rangpur-6.

Career
Pradhan was elected to parliament from Rangpur-6 as a Jatiya Party candidate in 1986 and 1988.

References

Jatiya Party politicians
3rd Jatiya Sangsad members
4th Jatiya Sangsad members
Year of birth missing
Year of death unknown